Bolnisi Sioni or Bolnisi Sioni Cathedral is a Georgian Orthodox basilica in the Bolnisi village of Bolnisi District, Georgia. The cathedral was built in 478–493. It is the oldest extant church building in Georgia. Bishop David was the overseeing church leader for the construction of Bolnisi Sioni.

Bolnisi Sioni Cathedral is known for its Georgian inscriptions. These are one of the oldest historical documents of the Georgian alphabet. This church is the first Georgian building to have a completion date on the exterior. Bolnisi Sioni’s decorative scheme was a Sasanian style. The southern and central parts of the church are adorned with curling vine scrolls, arabesques, and foliate motifs. Uniform masonry blocks were used to build on to the original building’s late antiquity remnants on the southern façade.

The country of Georgia was in contact with Persia during the time of Bolnisi Sioni’s construction. Evidence of this is in the decoration of the building. The sculpture and embellishments of Bolnisi Sioni and other surrounding Georgian churches are influenced from Iranian, Armenian, and Near Eastern art and architecture. The hunting depictions and sculpture are similar to Iranian 4th and 5th century art and architecture.

Bibliography 
 V. Beridze, Georgian Soviet Encyclopedia, 2, Tbilisi, 1977, p. 454
 Sh. Amiranashvili, History of Georgian Art, Tbilisi, 1971, pp. 113–118
 V. Beridze, Bolnisi Sioni // fresco, No. 2, 1968, pp. 23–25

References

External links 
 
 Bolnisi Sioni, Dzeglebi.ge
 Bolnisi Sioni, National Agency for Cultural Heritage Preservation of Georgia

Georgian Orthodox cathedrals in Georgia (country)
Eastern Orthodox church buildings
5th-century churches
Buildings and structures in Kvemo Kartli
Bolnisi
Tourist attractions in Kvemo Kartli